Autogenesis may refer to:
 Abiogenesis, the origination of life from non-living things, as believed by Aristotle and in modern evolutionary theory
 Orthogenesis, a discredited evolutionary idea that hypothesised a directed teleological form of evolution
 "Christ the Autogenes" in gnostic texts such as the Secret Book of John
 Autogeny, the reproductive strategy in insects in which the bodily food reserves of an adult female will support reproduction without feeding, particularly without a blood meal before oviposition
 The highest stage in the development of complex adaptive systems in Viable System Theory
 Autogenesis, a proposed kind of thermodynamic synergy that the first living creature may have possessed

Autogenous may refer to:
 Autogenous tissue in autotransplantation (tissue transplanted from elsewhere in an individual's own body)
 Autogenous weld, using no filler metal
 Autogenous grinding mill, in which ore grinds itself through tumbling impacts
 Autogenous models for the origins of cellular features, such as membrane-bound organelles or flagella
 Autogenous pyrometallurgy, in which the feedstock contains enough combustible material to fuel its own heating
 Autogenous training, a psychological technique for guiding one's own thoughts, feelings, or behaviors

Autogenic may refer to:
 Autogenic training, a desensitization-relaxation technique to alleviate stress
 Autogenic succession, ecological change driven by the organisms present in an environment
 Autogenic inhibition reflex, by which a muscle under high tension relaxes itself to avoid injury